James Oliver Van de Velde (April 3, 1795 – November 13, 1855) was a U.S. Catholic bishop born in Belgium. He served as the second Roman Catholic Bishop of Chicago between 1849 and 1853. He traveled to Rome in 1852 and petitioned the Pope for a transfer to a warmer climate, due to his health. In 1853, the transfer was granted; Van de Velde became bishop of the Diocese of Natchez, in Mississippi, where he served until his death two years later.

Childhood
His full name, almost never referenced in any materials about his life or religious career, was John Andrew James Oliver Benedict Rottheir Van de Velde. He was born April 3, 1795 in Lebbeke, near Dendermonde, then in the Austrian Netherlands and now in Belgium. He was soon given to a "pious aunty" to raise in Sint-Amands, in Flanders. A priest, fleeing the French Revolution, was staying with the same family and encouraged the boy to be devout. At the age of ten, Van de Velde was sent to a boarding school in Ghent. He did so well that by the age of eighteen he was teaching French and Flemish.

He had been teaching for only a short time when the Battle of Waterloo changed the political situation of the Low Countries. Belgium was reunited with the Netherlands under William of Orange. Planning to emigrate to England or Italy, Van de Velde began studying English and Italian. However, a seminary director persuaded him to stay in Belgium and teach Latin, French, and Flemish, while studying religion with the possibility of joining the priesthood.

Education

In 1815, Van de Velde began attending the famous Archiepiscopal Seminary at Mechlin. Two years later, he was one of the students selected by Father Charles Nerinckx, a missionary headed to the Americas on May 16, 1817.  The initial plan was for Van de Velde to complete his theological studies in a seminary in Bardstown, Kentucky. However, while crossing the Atlantic in the brig Mars, Van de Velde fell during a storm and "burst a blood vessel", which caused such loss of blood that, upon arrival in America, he was left too weak to make the overland journey to Kentucky. Instead, he retired to St. Mary's Seminary in Baltimore to recuperate. The storm had been so violent that the ship was adrift for three days without sails or a helm until repairs could be made. In addition, Van de Velde suffered from seasickness for a full month of the crossing.

Father Nerinckx advised Van de Velde to enter Georgetown College and the novitiate of the Society of Jesus rather than the seminary at Bardstown.
After he completed his two-year Jesuit novitiate at Georgetown University in Washington, D.C., Van de Velde continued his academic and theological studies for eight more years.

Priesthood

Novitiate
While in Belgium, Van de Velde had mentored a young man named Judocus Francis Van Assche. Father Nerinckx was making a funding trip to Belgium in 1820 and delivered a letter from Van de Velde to Van Aasche which strongly urged his former pupil to join Van de Velde in the new land. Although Van Assche received the letter in July 1820, it was not until September 23, 1821 that he arrived in Philadelphia. During the delay Van Aasche was able to recruit eight other men to come with him and Nerinckx on their return to America. Father Nerinckx, himself, had recruited two men to become lay brothers at his own mission of Loretto in Kentucky. However, after their arrival in Philadelphia, the two groups briefly separated. Van Assche's party of nine took a steamboat to Baltimore, where Archbishop Maréchal attempted to get Van Assche and his traveling companions to remain and attend his seminary. Two men agreed, one knowing he would not be able to join the Jesuit novitiate due to an outstanding debt to his own brother.

The remaining seven traveled overland by carriage to join Van de Velde at Georgetown in Washington, D.C. Father Nerinckx, who had advised the young men on shipboard to prefer the Society of Jesus to any other ecclesiastical opportunity, had temporarily separated from the group when they landed in Philadelphia, and now visited them at the Jesuit seminary in White Marsh, Maryland to congratulate them before returning to Kentucky, from which his "begging trip" had begun more than a year before. The seven had begun their probationary periods there October 6, 1821.

The recruitment of seven new applicants from Europe on the basis of a single letter from Van de Velde was an impressive accomplishment. At the time he had hardly finished his own two-year novitiate with the order. This contingent would eventually become the core of the Jesuit mission presence in Missouri.

Librarian
From the period 1818 to 1831, Van de Velde was the librarian for Georgetown College, and was proud to note that when he began, it was "a mere handful of some two hundred books and [he] left it in 1831 a great collection of twenty thousand volumes".  He also had command of numerous languages in which he preached and wrote: English, Flemish, French, German, Italian, Spanish, and Latin.

Ordination
Van de Velde was ordained on September 25, 1827, by the same Archbishop Ambrose Maréchal of Baltimore who had offered seminary educations to the Belgian men Van de Velde successfully recruited to the Jesuits. After his ordination Van de Velde completed his Georgetown education and, for two years' was the chaplain for the nearby Georgetown Visitation Preparatory School, a finishing school for Catholic girls. In 1829, he took over the missions of Rockville and Rock Creek in Montgomery County, Maryland.

Professor
In 1831, Van de Velde was sent to a professorship at the new Jesuit College of St. Louis, Missouri.  where he taught rhetoric and mathematics. The college became the University of St. Louis in 1833.  Van de Velde became a fully professed member of the Jesuits by taking his final vows in 1837, and by 1840, he was president of the Saint Louis University.

Vice-Provincial
Van de Velde continued to rise within the ranks of his order. In 1843 he became Vice-Provincial of the Society of Jesus. Three years later, as Western Provincial of the Jesuits, he attended an important council in Baltimore. He returned to St. Louis with a difficult itinerary by train through Boston, Albany, and Detroit, arriving in Chicago on June 13, 1846. He was hosted there by Chicago's bishop, William Quarter.  Three days later, Van de Velde departed via stagecoach for the trip from Chicago to St. Louis. Two years after their brief meeting, Bishop Quarter of Chicago died suddenly on April 10, 1848. The papal bull announcing Van de Velde's appointment as the next Bishop of Chicago arrived in the United States in December 1848.

Bishoprics
On February 11, 1849—Sexagesima Sunday—Van de Velde was consecrated Bishop of Chicago in the Church of St. Francis Xavier, attached to the University of St. Louis. The consecration was performed by Peter Richard Kenrick, Archbishop of St. Louis.

Pastoral pattern
On his way to Chicago, Van de Velde stopped and said Mass in the southern regions of his new diocese; in St. Louis, Missouri and in the Illinois towns of Cahokia, Kaskaskia, and Quincy. He preached in English, German, and French. He arrived in Chicago on Friday, March 30, 1849. These first weeks set a pattern for his pastoral activities as bishop: he would perform remarkable feats of travel within Illinois to minister to a Catholic population which was very poor and short of priests. He traveled by "river packet, stage, carriage, 'mud-wagon', and towards the end, occasionally by railroad", despite his poor health and Illinois' extremes of weather. He traveled by horseback when necessary, and slept on the road or in the mud-wagons. He said Mass for Germans in the state capitol, Springfield, and was shocked to learn that some of them had not had access to a priest for as much as four years.

Plans for his flock
Installed as bishop on Palm Sunday, 1849, two days after his arrival in the city, Van de Velde did not stay long in Chicago. The brutal winter climate there aggravated his rheumatism to the point that, not once, but twice he asked the Pope to permit him to resign as Chicago's bishop and return to being simply a Jesuit.  Despite his physical discomfort, Van de Velde embarked (and largely succeeded) in accomplishing his many resolute plans:
 the building of dozens of churches throughout Illinois,
 the start of what would become a major hospital which, in subsequent years became Rush Medical College, and continued to use the Sisters of Mercy as the nursing staff,
 creating orphanages for boys and girls left without families and homeless after the 1849 cholera epidemic.

Baltimore Conference
On April 30, 1852, he informed the faithful of his Chicago See of his intention of proceeding to Rome after a national plenary conference of Roman Catholic clergy to be held in Baltimore. He appointed an "Administrator and Vicar-General", Father P.T. (Patrick Thomas) McElhearne, to be his agent until his return.  He was gone until December, 1852.

The Baltimore conference began May 9, 1852. Among the issues decided by the Plenary Council was that Illinois should be divided into two bishoprics; Chicago in the north and Quincy in the south. However, Van de Velde believed this reduction of his workload would not satisfactorily address his health issues. Since it was known that he planned to visit Europe and petition the Pope about his desire to resign his bishopric, Van de Velde was chosen by the First Plenary Council of Baltimore to take the proposed decrees of the Church in the United States to Rome for Papal approval. He departed in late spring and returned on November 28, 1852.

Rome
Van de Velde had two audiences with Pope Pius IX and reiterated his health problems. The pope showed the "greatest affability".   If Bishop Van de Velde was not to be allowed to resign the bishopric completely, he pleaded for a transfer. One year from the time of his return to Chicago (at the end of 1852) he was installed as bishop in the warm-weather state of Mississippi. Bishop Van de Velde was appointed to take over the diocese of Natchez, Mississippi, on July 29, 1853, a year after the death of Bishop John Joseph Chanche, the founding bishop in that state. Bishop Van de Velde left Chicago on November 3 and arrived in Natchez November 23, 1853, and took formal possession of his see on December 18.

It had taken Van de Velde twenty months since attending the 1852 Plenary Council and asking them to endorse his request of resignation from the See of Chicago to actually get to Natchez and assume his new bishopric. The process of his transfer to Natchez was long and arduous, and certainly exceeded the time he actually was bishop there.

Natchez, Mississippi
The new Bishop of Natchez began an ambitious and much-needed program of land acquisition and repairs to church properties. One of his accomplishments was to gather the bones on the surface of the ground at the old Spanish cemetery and deposit them in a crypt under the sanctuary of St. Mary Cathedral. But, on October 23, 1855, only months after his arrival, he slipped on the front steps of his residence and broke his leg.  Yellow fever was epidemic in the city at that time and had killed forty of his parishioners. Already suffering a slight fever from the inflammation of his broken leg, Bishop Van de Velde caught yellow fever as well. Bishop Van de Velde made his final Confession twice, once in the evening and again in the morning, and the young priest at his bedside reported that he himself was so overcome that the Bishop had to help him with the wording of the ritual of Last Rites. Initially unable to take Communion due to the severity of his symptoms, the young priest considered it a special blessing that Van de Velde rallied sufficiently to be able to accept the sacrament just prior to his death.

Death
With his death only 23 months after arrival in Natchez, Bishop Van de Velde had little time to make any lasting impact on his new diocese. At 7AM on November 15, 1855, after weeks of fever and five final hours of paroxysms and sliding in and out of consciousness, Van de Velde expired on the feast day of St. Stanislaus, to whom he had reportedly just completed a novena. He was sixty years old.

His body was placed on view in lavish vestments with his eyes still partially open and his casket displayed on a tilt, "so as to give the impression of being partially erect", according to a letter sent back to Europe by a Jesuit priest informing fellow Jesuits and other European Catholics of Van de Veldes' death. His wake lasted long into the night and he was buried the next day, November 14, after a funeral Mass sung at the St. Mary's Cathedral by the Archbishop of New Orleans, Anthony Blanc.

See also
 Roman Catholic Diocese of Jackson, formerly Diocese of Natchez
 Pierre-Jean De Smet, fellow Belgian-American Jesuit from Van de Velde's hometown; author of eulogistic letter

References

External links
 St. Mary Basilica Archives, Natchez, Mississippi, James Oliver Van de Velde, S.J., second Bishop of Natchez
 St. Mary Basilica Natchez, Mississippi

Episcopal succession

1795 births
1855 deaths
19th-century American Jesuits
19th-century Roman Catholic bishops in the United States
Belgian emigrants to the United States
Georgetown College (Georgetown University) alumni
People from Chicago
Roman Catholic bishops in Mississippi
Roman Catholic bishops of Chicago
Roman Catholic Diocese of Jackson
People from Lebbeke